Liocrobyla is a genus of moths in the family Gracillariidae.

Species
Liocrobyla brachybotrys Kuroko, 1960
Liocrobyla desmodiella Kuroko, 1982
Liocrobyla kumatai Kuroko, 1982
Liocrobyla lobata Kuroko, 1960
Liocrobyla minima (Noreika, 1992)
Liocrobyla paraschista Meyrick, 1916
Liocrobyla saturata Bradley, 1961
Liocrobyla tephrosiae Vári, 1961

External links
Global Taxonomic Database of Gracillariidae (Lepidoptera)

Gracillariinae
Gracillarioidea genera